John Banister (December 26, 1734 – September 30, 1788) was an American Founding Father, lawyer, planter, and slave owner from Petersburg, Virginia. As a member of the Second Continental Congress, he assisted in framing the Articles of Confederation, which became the nation's first constitution in 1781.

Life 
The son of John Banister and grandson of John Baptist Banister the naturalist, he was educated at Middle Temple in London, England, admitted on September 27, 1753.  Banister served in the House of Burgesses (1765–1769, 1772–1775), Virginia House of Delegates (1776–1778, 1781–1784), and Second Continental Congress (1778–1779). While a delegate to the Continental Congress, he was a framer of the Articles of Confederation, which he signed on July 8, 1778. Banister also had served as a member of the Virginia Convention, which declared Virginia an independent state in 1776. He was appointed the first mayor of Petersburg in 1785.
He was well informed on current affairs and an established writer.

Banister was married three times. His first marriage was to Elizabeth Munford in 1755. After her death in 1770, he married Elizabeth "Patsy" Bland, the daughter of Theodorick Bland of Cawsons and the sister of Colonel Theodorick Bland. His second wife died in 1775, and four years later Banister married Agan (Scottish for Anna) Blair of Williamsburg, daughter of John Blair Sr. 

Banister's suburban villa in Petersburg, Battersea, was built in 1768 in a five-part Palladian style. In 1782, Banister was listed in Dinwiddie County records with three free males, 46 adult slaves, 42 slaves under age, 28 horses, 126 cattle, and one chariot.

Revolutionary War 
During the Revolutionary War, Banister was a major and lieutenant colonel of cavalry in the Virginia line militia (1778–1781). General and Commander-in-Chief George Washington regarded him highly, as witnessed by a letter he wrote to him from Valley Forge.  In 1781, he aided in supplying his militia and in repelling the British from his state.  Much of his personal property was lost. British forces under General William Phillips would commonly stop at his home in Battersea.

Death 
Banister is buried in the family plot at Hatcher's Run, the family estate in Dinwiddie County, Virginia.

References

Sources
 Johnson, Allen, ed. Dictionary of American Biography.  New York: Charles Scribner's Sons, 1936.

External links
Marquis Who's Who, Inc. Who Was Who in American History, the Military. Chicago: Marquis Who's Who, 1975.  
 

1734 births
1788 deaths
Founding Fathers of the United States
Signers of the Articles of Confederation
Virginia militiamen in the American Revolution
House of Burgesses members
Continental Congressmen from Virginia
18th-century American politicians
Members of the Virginia House of Delegates
Virginia lawyers
Politicians from Petersburg, Virginia
Virginia colonial people